The following list is an outline of the history of Los Angeles articles on English Wikipedia.

The city of Los Angeles, also known as LA or simply "The City of Angels," has a rich history dating back to the 1780s. The area was first settled by Spanish colonizers, who named it "El Pueblo de Nuestra Señora la Reina de los Ángeles del Río Porciúncula," which translates to "The Town of Our Lady the Queen of the Angels of the Porciúncula River." The city grew slowly during the Spanish and Mexican periods, but began to develop more rapidly after California became a US state in 1850. During the late 19th and early 20th centuries, LA became a major center for oil production and manufacturing, and its population exploded as people moved to the area for jobs. The city continued to grow in the second half of the 20th century, becoming a cultural and economic powerhouse with a diverse population. Today, Los Angeles is one of the largest cities in the United States and is known for its entertainment industry, beaches, and diverse neighborhoods.

Overviews
 History of African Americans in Los Angeles
 History of Armenian Americans in Los Angeles
 History of Central Americans in Los Angeles
 History of Iranian Americans in Los Angeles
 History of Israelis in Los Angeles
 History of the Japanese in Los Angeles
 History of Korean Americans in Greater Los Angeles
 History of Los Angeles
 History of Mexican Americans in Los Angeles
 History of the San Fernando Valley
 History of the Jews in Los Angeles
 Los Angeles in the 1920s
 History of the Los Angeles Police Department
 History of the University of California, Los Angeles

Timelines
 Timeline of Los Angeles

Lists
 National Register of Historic Places listings in Los Angeles
 List of Los Angeles Historic-Cultural Monuments in Downtown Los Angeles
 List of Los Angeles Historic-Cultural Monuments in Hollywood
 List of Los Angeles Historic-Cultural Monuments in Silver Lake, Angelino Heights, and Echo Park
 List of Los Angeles Historic-Cultural Monuments in South Los Angeles
 List of Los Angeles Historic-Cultural Monuments in the Harbor area
 List of Los Angeles Historic-Cultural Monuments in the San Fernando Valley
 List of Los Angeles Historic-Cultural Monuments in the Wilshire and Westlake areas
 List of Los Angeles Historic-Cultural Monuments on the East and Northeast Sides
 List of Los Angeles Historic-Cultural Monuments on the Westside
 List of museums in Los Angeles

Topics

 Pueblo de Los Angeles
 Los Angeles Pobladores
 Los Angeles & San Pedro Railroad
 Tongva
 Pacific Electric Railway
 Los Angeles Railway

Events

 Assassination of Robert F. Kennedy
 Baldwin Hills Dam disaster
 1923 San Pedro maritime strike
 1933 Griffith Park fire
 Los Angeles Garment Workers strike of 1933
 Battle of La Mesa

Natural disasters

 1933 Long Beach earthquake
 Los Angeles flood of 1938
 1994 Northridge earthquake
 1971 San Fernando earthquake
 1987 Whittier Narrows earthquake
 1971 San Fernando earthquake

Categories
 :Category:Centuries in Los Angeles
 :Category:Decades in Los Angeles
 :Category:Years in Los Angeles

References

Outlines of geography and places
Outlines of history and events
 
Los Angeles-related lists